Paronychia fastigiata, common names hairy forked chickweed, hairy forked nailwort, and forked chickweed, is an annual plant native to North America.

Conservation status within the United States
It is listed as a special concern species and believed extirpated in Connecticut, and it is endangered in Minnesota.

References

fastigiata